Heydar Baghi (also Romanized as Ḩeydar Bāghī) is a village in Ajorluy-ye Sharqi Rural District, Baruq District, Miandoab County, West Azerbaijan Province, Iran. At the 2006 census, its population was 437, in 92 families.

References 

Populated places in Miandoab County